"The Living Years" is a soft rock  ballad written by B. A. Robertson and Mike Rutherford, and recorded by Rutherford's British rock band Mike + The Mechanics. It was released in December 1988 in the United Kingdom and in the United States as the second single from their album Living Years. The song was a chart hit around the world, topping the US Billboard Hot 100 on 25 March 1989, the band's only number-one and last top ten hit on that chart, and reaching number-one in Australia, Canada and Ireland and number 2 in the UK. It spent four weeks at number-one on the US Billboard Adult Contemporary chart. Paul Carrack sings lead vocals on the track.

The song addresses a son's regret over unresolved conflict with his now-deceased father. It won the Ivor Novello Award for Best Song Musically and Lyrically in 1989, and was nominated for four Grammy awards in 1990, including Record and Song of the Year, as well as Best Pop Performance by a Duo or Group with Vocals and Best Video. In 1996, famed composer Burt Bacharach opined that the song was one of the finest lyrics of the last ten years.

In 2004, "The Living Years" was awarded a 4-Million-Air citation by BMI.

Music video
The music video was directed by Tim Broad and premiered in January 1989. It was filmed in October 1988 in West Somerset, England, near Porlock Weir and the hamlet of Culbone. The video features Mike Rutherford with his then-eight-year-old son, Tom. It also includes an appearance by actress Maggie Jones, best known for playing Blanche Hunt in the soap opera Coronation Street.

The video also shows the group playing the song (with Paul Young playing keyboards), with two sets of choirs singing the chorus with them, an all-boys church choir and an adult choir.

Composition 
The song is entirely in G♯/A♭ Major.

Personnel

Mike + The Mechanics
 Mike Rutherford – electric rhythm guitar, bass guitar
 Paul Carrack – lead vocals
 Paul Young – backing vocals
 Adrian Lee – keyboards
 Peter Van Hooke – drums

Additional personnel
 Sal Gallina – keyboards
 BA Robertson – keyboards
 Alan Murphy – guitar
 Martin Ditcham – percussion
 Luís Jardim – percussion
 Christopher Neil – backing vocals
 Alan Carvell – backing vocals
 Choir: Child and adult studio musicians, recorded in NYC studio separately

Charts and certifications

Weekly charts

Year-end charts

Certifications

Covers
There are alternative recordings of the song, instrumental as well as vocal, reggae to classical crossover, from artists as diverse as American country music band Alabama, Chris De Burgh, West End theatre star Michael Ball, Marcia Hines, Engelbert Humperdinck, James Last, The London Symphony Orchestra, Christian artist Russ Lee, Rhydian, John Tesh, Russell Watson, the London Community Gospel Choir, the Newsboys, The Isaacs, The Katinas, Japanese singer Kaho Shimada, Italian band Dik Dik and Michael English.

Mike + The Mechanics band member Paul Carrack, who performed the original lead vocal, has made a number of solo interpretations. His father died in an industrial accident when Carrack was eleven, making the lyrics particularly poignant for him. It is still a mainstay of Carrack's live performances today.

References

External links
 

1988 singles
1989 singles
Mike + The Mechanics songs
Rock ballads
Pop ballads
Billboard Hot 100 number-one singles
Cashbox number-one singles
Number-one singles in Australia
1980s ballads
Irish Singles Chart number-one singles
Songs about fathers
Song recordings produced by Christopher Neil
Songs written by Mike Rutherford
Songs written by BA Robertson
Atlantic Records singles
Warner Music Group singles
RPM Top Singles number-one singles
1988 songs